Bacoor, officially the City of Bacoor, is a 1st class component city in the province of Cavite, Philippines. According to the 2020 census, it has a population of 664,625 people, making it the 15th most populous city in the Philippines and the second largest city in the province of Cavite after Dasmariñas.

Etymology
Some accounts indicate that the city of Bacoor, also named Bakood or Bakoor was founded as a pueblo or town in 1671. When Spanish troops first arrived in Bacoor they met some local inhabitants in the process of building a bamboo fence (bakod in Filipino) around a house. The Spaniards asked the men the name of the village but because of the difficulties in understanding each other, the local inhabitants thought the Spaniards were asking what they were building. The men answered "bakood". The Spaniards pronounced it as "bacoor" which soon became the town's name.

In Spanish conquistador Miguel de Loarca's book Relacion de Las Islas Filipinas, published in 1582, Bacoor is mentioned as Vacol, which may have been derived from "bakod" or bamboo fence in Tagalog:

History

Spanish period

Bacoor was one of the flashpoints of the Cavite Mutiny of 1872. Bacoor's parish priest at that time, Fr. Mariano Gómez, was one of the GOMBURZA trio implicated in the mutiny for advocating the secularization of priesthood in the Philippines. He and the rest of GOMBURZA were executed at Bagumbayan in 1872. The death of the GOMBURZA served as the inspiration for Jose Rizal's El Filibusterismo, which in turn influenced the ignition of the Philippine Revolution.

During the Philippine Revolution against Spain in 1896, Bacoor was one of the first towns in Cavite to rise up. A Katipunan chapter, codenamed Gargano, led by Gil Ignacio from barrio Banalo, started the hostilities in Bacoor on September 2, 1896, three days after the revolution began.

On February 17, 1897, General Emilio Aguinaldo's 40,000-strong force confronted a 20,000-strong Spanish reinforcement at the Zapote River. The Katipuneros reinforced the southern bank of the river with trenches designed by Filipino engineer Edilberto Evangelista. Edilberto Evangelista was known as the "Engineer of the revolution" and the "Hero of the revolution". They also blew up the Zapote Bridge with explosives which killed several Spaniards crossing it and thereby preventing them from reaching Cavite and forcing them to retreat to Muntinlupa. Despite the Filipino victory, they lost the brilliant Evangelista who was killed in action.

However, after the Spanish counteroffensive in May 1897, Bacoor and the rest of Cavite finally fell to the Spaniards, forcing Aguinaldo and his men to retreat to Biak-na-Bato.

American period

With the Philippine declaration of independence from Spain on June 12, 1898, hostilities reignited in Cavite and Bacoor was designated as the first capital of Emilio Aguinaldo's revolutionary government until it was transferred to Malolos, Bulacan in August 1898, a month before the convening of the Malolos Congress. The Zapote Bridge became the site once again of another battle on June 13, 1899, this time between Philippine and American troops. An American force of 1,200 men supported by naval gunfire from the American squadron in Manila Bay crushed a 5,000-strong Filipino force led by General Pío del Pilar. Zapote Bridge's special place in Philippine history is depicted today in Bacoor's city seal.

Japanese occupation
During World War II, in 1942, Japanese occupation forces entered Bacoor and other towns of Cavite province. From May 7, 1942, to August 15, 1945, many Caviteños joined the Cavite Guerrilla Unit (CGU), a recognized guerrilla group headed by Colonel Mariano Castañeda. This group would eventually become the Filipino-American Cavite Guerrilla Forces (FACGF). Colonel Francisco Guerrero and the FACGF's 2nd Infantry Regiment was put in charge of Japanese resistance in Bacoor. The FAGCF, together with Filipino soldiers under the 4th, and 42nd Infantry Division of the Philippine Commonwealth Army liberated and recaptured Bacoor and 4th Constabulary Regiment of the Philippine Constabulary was defeated the Japanese Imperial Army forces from January 1, to August 15, 1945, during the Allied liberation of the Philippines.

Post-war
On June 21, 1988, Mayor Angelito Miranda was assassinated in front of a hospital in Las Piñas by two gunmen, which the police claimed to be from a notorious drug syndicate.

Cityhood

During the 1990s and 2000s, Bacoor attempted to achieve cityhood status due to its growing population and tax income, with several cityhood bills filed in Congress in 1997, 2000 and 2007. On July 25, 2011, President Benigno Simeon Aquino III signed into law Republic Act No. 10160 creating the City of Bacoor. It was ratified through a plebiscite on June 23, 2012, wherein 36,226 of the town's 40,080 registered voters voted in favor of cityhood while those against were 3,854. With the incorporation of Bacoor as a city, it was divided into two legislative districts, Bacoor West and Bacoor East. During the 2013 mid-term elections, the citizens of Bacoor voted for six councilors for each districts forming a 12-person city council.

Geography

Physical
Bacoor is strategically located at the gateway to Metro Manila. It is bordered to the east by Las Piñas and Muntinlupa, to the south by Dasmariñas, to the west by Kawit and Imus, and to the north by Bacoor Bay an inlet of Manila Bay. Bacoor is separated from Las Piñas by the Zapote River and from Imus and Kawit by Bacoor River.

Most of the city is composed of flat, formerly agricultural lands, with some areas such as the coastal barangays of Zapote, Talaba, Niog, and Panapaan lying below sea level. Some barangays such as Molino and Queens Row are situated on the hills that form valleys along the upstream portion of Zapote River.

Barangays
Bacoor is politically subdivided into 73 barangays grouped into two local electoral districts officially called Bacoor West and Bacoor East, which are represented in the city council by their respective councilors. However, the city government has officially abandoned such name designation for the electoral districts and has released edicts officially calling them as District 1 and District 2, respectively.

Bacoor West (District 1)

Bacoor East (District 2)

Climate
Under the Köppen climate classification system, Bacoor features a tropical savanna climate that borders on a tropical monsoon climate (Köppen climate classification Aw/Am). Together with the rest of the Philippines, Bacoor lies entirely within the tropics. However, humidity levels are usually very high which makes it feel much warmer. It has a distinct dry season from late December through April, and a relatively lengthy wet season that covers the remaining period. Southwest monsoon or Habagat can occur from June to September and can cause flooding in parts of the city.

Demographics

It is the second most populous city in the province after Dasmariñas.

The city is a bedroom community of Metro Manila which owes its large population to the influx of low and middle-income settlers who availed of the various housing projects and subdivisions in it.

Religion

Roman Catholicism is the dominant religion in Bacoor. It is part of the Diocese of Imus and is the seat of the Vicariate of St. Michael the Archangel and the Vicariate of Santo Niño de Molino. One of Bacoor's notable parish priests was Fr. Mariano Gómez, one of the GOMBURZA trio implicated in the Cavite Mutiny who served as parish priest at the Bacoor parish church from 1824 to his death in 1872. Another notable priest who served the parish of Bacoor was St. Ezekiel Moreno at the time when it was still part of the vast hacienda of the Recollects. He tirelessly provided the Last Rites to the victims of a cholera plague which affected the towns of Bacoor and Imus and was responsible for the rehabilitation of the Molino Dam to irrigate the rice fields of Bacoor and Las Piñas.

Most of the original inhabitants of Bacoor are Aglipayans. During the Philippine Revolution, many of Bacoor's inhabitants became members of the Philippine Independent Church, also known as the Aglipayan Church, the religious arm of General Emilio Aguinaldo's government. The Aglipayan Church has a long and colorful history in the city. It is one of the first places in the Philippines to join the new movement, and the Catholic priest at that time, Fr. Fortunato Clemena, became the first Aglipayan priest of Bacoor, as well as the first Aglipayan Bishop of Cavite, during the Aglipayan Schism period. Most of the first members of the church in Bacoor were Katipuneros headed by General Mariano Noriel, who is also the first president of the laymen organization. Despite the influx of largely non-Aglipayan migrants from Manila and from other provinces, the strong presence of the Aglipayan church is still evident in the city. The Aglipayan Diocese of Cavite's Cathedral in Barangay Digman, which was also dedicated to St. Michael the Archangel, is situated a few blocks away from the town's Catholic church. It is the second dominant religion in Bacoor.

Bacoor also has a significant population of Muslims, mostly middle-class Maranao traders and merchants, with a minority of Badjao fishing communities. Several mosques cater to the local Muslim community of Bacoor, the largest being Masjid As-Salaamah, opposite Zapote market. A number of Protestant and other Christian denominations also have a presence in the city.

Economy

Commerce
Bacoor is currently experiencing a rapid shift from an agriculture-based economy to a residential/commercial urban center. Nowadays, retail, manufacturing, banking and service sectors are Bacoor's primary income earners. Commercial activities are sporadic throughout the city ranging from wholesale to retail establishments, restaurants and eateries, hardware and construction supplies and other service-related industries, especially those located in SM City Bacoor where it serves as the city's main income earner. The mostly residential area of Molino is also home to SM Center Molino at the corner of Molino Road and Daang Hari. The entrance area from the Coastal Road to Aguinaldo Highway in Talaba and the area surrounding the Zapote Public Market (now the Bacoor Public Market) are other commercial centers. Bacoor has branches of 11 different commercial banks all over the city.

Meanwhile, agricultural area has lessened to only 100 hectares while fishponds which likewise decreased to almost half of the original 760 hectares. Salt production, fishing, oyster and mussel culture, which are now being threatened to near extinction because of pollution and overpopulation, are the other sources of income of the residents. These industries are also threatened by the construction of the Cavite Coastal Road Extension which directly affected the Bacoor shoreline.

Land use
Land use developments in Bacoor include a proposed industrial village in Barangay Niog which will include light cottage industries with supporting residential and commercial facilities. A vast tract of land in Molino area, on the other hand, is envisioned to host residential, institutional and commercial facilities. Dubbed as the New Bacoor, the land use plan in Molino seeks to utilize the area not only as a dormitory for individuals who work in Metro Manila but also for people who have migrated to Bacoor in search of economic advancement.

Government

City seal

The current seal of the City of Bacoor was adopted in 2012 after its conversion to city. It bears resemblance to the previous seal when Bacoor was still a municipality, but with additional symbols that reflect the city's character and recent developments. It is composed of a circular ribbon with the phrases Lungsod ng Bacoor (City of Bacoor) and Lalawigan ng Cavite (Province of Cavite) on the top and bottom portion of the ribbon. The ribbon symbolizes the continuity of Bacoor's time-honored traditions despite its conversion to a city. On the foreground is the Zapote Bridge, which was the site of two major battles during the Philippine Revolution against Spain and the Filipino-American War. The bridge features 73 bricks symbolizing the 73 barangays that make up to city. Written on the bridge is 1671, the year the city was founded.

Underneath the bridge is a body of water symbolizing Zapote River, which passes through the city. Floating over it is a mussel shell, a seafood cultivated in the city and symbolizes its two new districts, Bacoor West and Bacoor East. On top of the bridge is an 11-member marching band, symbolizing the 11 marching bands that are found in the city and a callback to its nickname as the country's marching band capital. Serving as background to the bridge are (on the left) a bamboo tree, from which the city's name was taken and describes the resilient nature of its people; and (on the right) buildings, which symbolizes the city's progress. Between these two symbols is the Philippine sun with its eight rays, signifying the city's role in the province during the revolution against Spain. Above the sun is 2012, the year Bacoor was converted into a city of Cavite. Behind these symbols are the colors of the Philippine flag: red, which symbolizes courage; white, symbolizing peace; and blue, which symbolizes the people of Bacoor's calmness, serenity and commitment to protecting the environment, as well as of the waters of its rivers and Manila Bay.

Executive

Pursuant to Chapter II, Title II, Book III of Republic Act No. 7160 or the Local Government Code of 1991, the city government is to be composed of a mayor (alkalde), a vice mayor (bise alkalde) and members (kagawad) of the legislative branch Sangguniang Panlungsod alongside a secretary to the said legislature, all of which are elected to a three-year term and are eligible to run for three consecutive terms.

As with every Philippine city, Bacoor's chief executive is the city mayor. Elected to a term of three years and limited to three consecutive terms, the chief executive appoints the directors of each city department, which include the office of administration, engineering office, information office, legal office, and treasury office. The incumbent mayor of Bacoor is Lani Mercado-Revilla, from the Lakas Party, who first served as the city's lone representative in the Philippine House of Representatives from 2010 to 2016. She is the wife or former Senator Ramon Revilla, Jr.

The city's vice mayor performs duties as acting governor in the absence of the mayor. The vice mayor also automatically succeeds as mayor upon the death of the incumbent. The vice mayor also convenes the Sangguniang Panlungsod, the city's legislative body. The incumbent vice mayor of Bacoor is Catherine Sarino-Evaristo from the Lakas Party. She first assumed office on June 30, 2013, after defeating former vice mayor Rosette Miranda-Fernando. She ran and was elected for a second term in 2016.

Legislative
The city, which is a lone congressional district, is represented in the Philippine House of Representatives by congressman Strike Revilla from the Lakas Party, brother-in-law of Mayor Lani Mercado-Revilla. He first assumed office as city mayor from 2007 to 2016. Within the city, the City Board or Sangguniang Panlungsod crafts all city ordinances, performs appropriation of city funds, issues franchises and permits, impose fees on city services, and exercise other duties and powers as stipulated by the Local Government Code of 1991. Being a first-class city in terms of income, Bacoor is entitled to a City Board composed of 12 members, six each from the city's two board districts.

Infrastructure

Transportation

Bacoor is described as a bedroom community with most of its citizens commuting to and from Metro Manila to work. The city is the connected to Metro Manila by expressways like CAVITEX and Muntinlupa–Cavite Expressway, national roads like Aguinaldo Highway (N62/N419) and Quirino Avenue (N62) in the north, and other major thoroughfares like Daang Hari and Marcos Alvarez Avenue. It is also the terminus of the Aguinaldo Highway and Tirona Highway which connects the city to the rest of Cavite. Common forms of transportation are buses, mini-buses, public utility vans, jeepneys.

Due to the congestion of Bacoor's major thoroughfares and overpopulation, the city suffers from daily heavy traffic. This is expected to be eased in the future with the construction of the Manila Light Rail Transit System's southern terminus in the city. The LRT 1 South Extension project would see the LRT-1 extended from Baclaran in Pasay to Niog in Bacoor. The project's estimated cost is P65 billion.

On September 12, 2014, the Benigno Aquino III administration awarded the contract for the construction of the LRT 1 South Extension project to the Light Rail Manila Consortium, which is composed of Metro Pacific Investments Corporation, AC Infrastructure Holdings Corp. (a subsidiary of Ayala Corporation), Sumitomo Corporation, and Macquarie Infrastructure Holdings (Philippines) Pte. Ltd.

The groundbreaking for the LRT Line 1 South Extension Project was held on Thursday, May 4, 2017, with the actual construction officially commencing on Tuesday, May 7, 2019, after the right-of-way became "free and clear" from obstructions. The extension is slated for partial operations by late 2024 or early 2025 and full operations by second quarter of 2027. Once fully operational, Bacoor will be served by the LRT-1 via the future Niog station.

Bacoor is also part of the proposed Cavite–Laguna Expressway (CALAX) which will be funded through debt financing.  Metro Pacific Tollways Corp. (MPTC), which will undertake the construction of CALAX, has announced it will borrow P30 billion for the project. MPTC president Rodrigo Franco "said the firm will partner with local banks for debt financing by earlier next year."

Health
To address the health concerns of the city's ageing population and urban poor population, several public and private hospitals have been established in the city. The local government also initiated a discount program for senior citizens in city wherein they can avail of discounted medical care and medicines in hospitals in and outside of Bacoor.

Along with a number of small private clinics, Bacoor has one major public hospital and seven major private hospitals:

 Bacoor District Hospital
 Bacoor Doctors Medical Center
 Crisostomo General Hospital
 Metro South Medical Center 
 Molino Doctors Hospital
 Southeast Asian Medical Center 
 St. Dominic Medical Center
 St. Michael Medical Hospital

Public safety
The Bacoor Traffic Management Department (BTMD) and the Bacoor Public Safety Unit are the main agencies tasked for maintaining peace and order in the city. The Bacoor Police Station, a component of the Cavite Police Provincial Office under the Philippine National Police, assists them in this regard. Given the status of the BTMD as the highest office in the local bureaucracy (with the status of a department), it has been entrusted by the city government to oversee ordinance implementation city-wide with the PNP playing second fiddle.

Education

As a bedroom community, Bacoor is home to public and private education institutions. There are 27 public elementary schools and seven public high schools throughout the city. Students in the public school sector study under the K–12 curriculum. There are numerous privately run elementary schools and high schools. Several private colleges offer academic as well as technical-vocational education.

The city is home to two universities: University of Perpetual Help System DALTA and a campus of the Cavite State University.

Notable personalities

 Christian Bables, award-winning Filipino actor; won Best Supporting Actor at the Gawad Urian Awards for his role as Barbs in the movie Die Beautiful
 Ernie Baron, weather forecaster and host of Knowledge Power on ABS-CBN; also known as "The Walking Encyclopedia"
 John Philip Bughaw, also known as "Balang", a child dancer and actor who performed on The Ellen DeGeneres Show
 Joseph Eric Buhain, swimmer, chairman of the Games and Amusement Board of the Philippines
 Serafin Cuevas, lawyer and former Associate Justice of the Supreme Court of the Philippines (1984–1986) and Secretary of Justice (1998–2000)
 Francine Diaz, Filipina actress and model
 Rubylita Garcia, murdered journalist for the newspapers Remate and The Pilipino Times
 Leon Guinto, Mayor of the City of Manila during the Japanese occupation
 Mariano Noriel, served as general under Emilio Aguinaldo's revolutionary army during the 1896 Philippine Revolution
 Diether Ocampo, actor, singer, and model
 Rey D. Pagtakhan, Canadian physician, professor and politician. He was a cabinet minister in the governments of Jean Chrétien and Paul Martin, and served as a member of parliament from 1988 until his defeat in the 2004 election
 Onyok Pineda, Filipino child actor best known for his role as Onyok in the television series FPJ's Ang Probinsyano
 Marian Rivera, commercial model, actress, and TV host; wife of actor Dingdong Dantes
 Julio Sadorra, Filipino chess grandmaster
 Arra San Agustin, Filipina television actress and model
 Wesley So, eighth youngest chess grandmaster in history
 Strike Revilla, Filipino businessperson and politician
 Luis Yangco, Filipino-Chinese entrepreneur and shipping magnate, known as the "King of Manila Bay and Pasig River" for his control of the shipping industry in the two bodies of water. He was also a financier of the La Liga Filipina, the Katipunan, and the Aguinaldo Revolutionary Government.

Sister cities
Local
 Manila, Metro Manila
 Davao City

Gallery

References

External links

 
Bacoor Information (as retrieved from Cavite.info)
Official Website of the Provincial Government of Cavite
 [ Philippine Standard Geographic Code]
Philippine Census Information

 
Cities in Cavite
Former national capitals
Populated places on Manila Bay
Populated places established in 1671
1671 establishments in the Philippines
Component cities in the Philippines